Jan Styrna (25 January 1941 – 28 September 2022) was a Polish Roman Catholic prelate.

Styrna was born in Poland and was ordained to the priesthood in 1965. He served as titular bishop of Aquipendium and as auxiliary bishop of the Roman Catholic Diocese of Tarnów, Poland, from 1991 to 2001 and as the bishop of the Roman Catholic Diocese of Elblag, Poland, from 2003 until his resignation in 2013.

References

1941 births
2022 deaths
Polish Roman Catholic bishops
20th-century Roman Catholic bishops in Poland
21st-century Roman Catholic bishops in Poland
Bishops appointed by Pope John Paul II
People from Elbląg